The discography of Kings of Leon, an American rock band, consists of eight studio albums, one live album, two compilation albums, two video album, five extended plays, 26 singles, one promotional single and 26 music videos. As of 2016 the band has sold over 21 million albums worldwide and 38 million singles. The band released their debut extended play Holy Roller Novocaine in February 2003, followed by the release of the extended play What I Saw in May. Their debut studio album, Youth and Young Manhood, was released in July 2003, peaking at number 113 on the US Billboard 200 and number three on the UK Albums Chart. The album has since been certified two times platinum by the British Phonographic Industry (BPI) and three times platinum by the Australian Recording Industry Association (ARIA). Three singles were released from the album, including the UK top 40 hit "Molly's Chambers". In November 2004, Kings of Leon released their second album, Aha Shake Heartbreak. The album peaked at number 55 on the Billboard 200 and number three on the UK Albums Chart. It has been certified double platinum by the BPI and the ARIA. The album's first single, "The Bucket", peaked at number 16 in the UK; it also became the band's first single to chart in the United States, where it peaked at number 23 on the US Billboard Alternative Songs chart.

In March 2007, the band's third album Because of the Times was released, peaking at number 25 on the Billboard 200 and topping the Irish, New Zealand and UK albums charts. Two of the album's singles, "On Call" and "Fans", became top 20 hits in the UK. Because of the Times has since been certified two times platinum by the ARIA and by the BPI and three times platinum by the Irish Recorded Music Association (IRMA). The band saw their biggest commercial success with the release of their fourth studio album, Only by the Night, in September 2008. The album spawned the hit singles "Sex on Fire" and "Use Somebody", which peaked at numbers 56 and 4 respectively on the US Billboard Hot 100 and became top ten hits in multiple other countries. Only by the Night peaked at number four on the Billboard 200, while topping the charts in the charts of multiple countries, including Australia, Ireland, New Zealand and the UK. It received multiple multi-platinum certifications; the album was certified double platinum by the RIAA, eleven times platinum by the ARIA and nine times platinum by the BPI. Only by the Night went on to become the twenty-first best selling album worldwide in 2008, according to the International Federation of the Phonographic Industry.

Come Around Sundown, the band's fifth studio album, was released in October 2010. The album peaked at number two on the Billboard 200 and topped the charts in countries such as Australia, Canada, New Zealand and the UK. The album has since been certified Gold by the RIAA and two times platinum by the ARIA. "Radioactive", the first single from Come Around Sundown, peaked at number 37 on the Billboard Hot 100 and topped the Alternative Songs chart.

Albums

Studio albums

Live albums

Compilation albums

Video albums

Extended plays

Singles

As lead artist

Promotional singles

Other charted songs

Guest appearances

Music videos

Notes

References

External links
 Official website
 Kings of Leon at AllMusic
 
 

Rock music group discographies
Discographies of American artists
Discography